The All Pakistan Federation of Labour (APFOL) is a national trade union centre in Pakistan. It was founded in 1951 by Rahmatullah Chaudhary.

In 2004, All Pakistan Federation of Labour officeholders and other labour leaders demanded the repeal of anti-labour law, called Industrial Relations Ordinance (IRO)-2002 from the Pakistani government.

All Pakistan Federation of Labour merged into Pakistan Workers' Federation in 2005 which, in turn, is affiliated with the International Trade Union Confederation based in Brussels, Belgium.

References

Trade unions in Pakistan
International Trade Union Confederation
Labour relations in Pakistan
Labour history of Pakistan
Trade unions established in 1951
1951 establishments in Pakistan